Neseuterpia is a genus of beetles in the family Cerambycidae, containing the following species:

 Neseuterpia couturieri Tavakilian, 2001
 Neseuterpia curvipes Villiers, 1980
 Neseuterpia deknuydti Chalumeau & Touroult, 2005

References

Acanthocinini